The Philadelphia Summer International is a senior-level figure skating competition held in Philadelphia, Pennsylvania. In 2015 and 2017, it was included in the International Skating Union's calendar. The event takes place early in the season, generally in August. Medals are awarded in men's and ladies' singles.

Senior results

Men

Women

Junior results

Men

Women

References

External links 
 

International figure skating competitions hosted by the United States